Aoi (あおい, アオイ) is both a Japanese given name and a Japanese surname.

Possible writings
葵, "hollyhock"
碧, "beautiful"
蒼, "blue"
蒼井, "blue, well"
青井, "blue, well"
藍井, "indigo, well"

People
with the given name Aoi
Aoi (born 1984), Japanese singer
Aoi (葵), vocalist of Japanese rock band Ayabie
Aoi (葵, born 1979), guitarist of Japanese rock band The Gazette
, Japanese baseball player
, Japanese manga artist
, Japanese voice actress
, Japanese badminton player
, Japanese actress
, Japanese actress and model
, Japanese fashion model and actress
, Japanese actor
, Japanese manga artist
, Japanese character designer and illustrator
, Japanese ice hockey player
, Japanese voice actress
, Japanese singer and voice actress
, Japanese voice actress

with the surname Aoi
, Japanese singer
, Japanese manga artist
, Japanese singer and voice actor
, Japanese AV idol
, Japanese AV idol
, Japanese actress and idol
, Japanese actress and model

Fictional characters
with the given name Aoi
, Laughing Man's alias, a character in the anime series Ghost in the Shell: Stand Alone Complex
Aoi Akane, a character in the anime series [[Toilet Bound Hanako-Kun]]
, a character in the anime series Wish Upon the Pleiades
, a character in the video game series Danganronpa
, a character in the manga series Coppelion
, a character in the manga series You're Under Arrest
, a character in the light novel series Asobi ni Iku yo!
, a character in the anime series Vividred Operation
, a character in the anime series Infinite Ryvius
, a character in the manga series Maid Sama!
, a character in the slot machine game series Kaitō Tenshi Twin Angel
, a character in the series Kimetsu no Yaiba
, a character in the manga series Dr. Slump
, a character in the arcade game Aikatsu!
, a character in the manga series Full Moon o Sagashite
, a character in the manga series Seiyu's Life!
, a character in the manga series Beelzebub
, a character in the video game Nine Hours, Nine Persons, Nine Doors
, protagonist of the novel series Kyōto Teramachi Sanjō no Holmes
, a character in the visual novel To Heart
, protagonist of the visual novel If My Heart Had Wings
, a character in the manga series Moyasimon: Tales of Agriculture
, a character in the manga series Zettai Karen Children
, a character in the light novel series Ro-Kyu-Bu!
, a character in the manga series Ai Yori Aoshi
, a character in the manga series Castle Town Dandelion
, a character in the light novel series Rail Wars!
, a character in the anime series My-HiME
, a character in the manga series Kekkaishi
, a character in the anime series Kirakira Pretty Cure a la Mode
, a character in the light novel series Fate/Zero
, protagonist of the light novel series Kakuriyo no Yadomeshi
, a wife of Hikaru Genji in the classic The Tale of Genji
, a character in the video game series Virtua Fighter
, a character in the manga series Encouragement of Climb
, a character in the light novel series Haganai
, a character in the anime series Yu-Gi-Oh! VRAINS
, a character in the music media franchise D4DJ

with the surname Aoi
, a character in the anime series selector infected WIXOSS
, a character in the manga series Whispered Words
Jun Aoi, a character in the anime series Martian Successor Nadesico
Kazuha Aoi, a character in the anime series Freezing
Kazuya Aoi, a character in the anime series Freezing
, a character in the manga series Legendz
, protagonist of the light novel series Strawberry Panic!
, a character in the visual novel Chaos;Head
, a character in the film Battle Royale II: Requiem
, a character in the light novel series Horizon in the Middle of Nowhere
, a character in the manga series Age 12
Valt Aoi (蒼井 バルト, Aoi Baruto) is the main character of the anime/manga Beyblade Burst and Beyblade Burst God/Evolution and supporting character in the rest of the seasons
Toko[natsu] and Nika Aoi (蒼井常夏, Aoi Tokonatsu & 蒼井日夏, Aoi Nika ) are the younger siblings of Valt Aoi . They appear in the anime/manga Beyblade Burst, Beyblade Burst God/Evolution, and Beyblade Burst Chouzetsu/Turbo 

Japanese unisex given names
Japanese-language surnames